This is a list of civil parishes in the ceremonial county of Shropshire, England. There are 230 civil parishes.

Population figures are unavailable for some of the smallest parishes.

See also
 List of civil parishes in England
 :Category:Former civil parishes in Shropshire

References

External links
 Office for National Statistics : Geographical Area Listings

Civil parishes
Civil parishes
Shropshire

Civil parishes